The 2022–23 National Cricket League was the twenty-fourth edition of the National Cricket League (NCL), a first-class cricket competition held in Bangladesh. The eight teams taking part were placed into two tiers, with Chittagong Division getting promoted to Tier 1 after their victory in Tier 2 of the 2021–22 season, replacing Khulna Division who were relegated. The tournament started on 10 October 2022, and concluded on 17 November 2022 with Rangpur Division as champions, their second NCL title. This edition of the tournament was the first to use the Dukes cricket ball, rather than the SG ball used in previous editions.

Points table

Tier 1

Tier 2

Fixtures

Tier 1

Tier 2

References

External links
 Series home at ESPN Cricinfo

Bangladesh National Cricket League
National Cricket League
2022 in Bangladeshi cricket
Bangladeshi cricket seasons from 2000–01